Safiya Hassan Sheikh Ali Jimale is a Somali politician. She is the Mayor of Beledweyne, and is the country's first female mayor.

References

See also 

 List of first women mayors (21st century)

Living people
Place of birth missing (living people)
Year of birth missing (living people)
Women mayors of places in Somalia
21st-century Somalian women politicians
21st-century Somalian politicians
People from Beledweyne
Mayors of places in Somalia